Cameron Johnson (born July 2, 1999) is an American actor. In 2020 he starred in the independent horror film Star Light.

Personal life
Johnson is the son of Eric Johnson and Phyllis Johnson (née Catalon). He has two brothers, Eric II and Myles. He grew up in Maurice, Louisiana but currently resides in Los Angeles, California. He attended North Vermilion High in his hometown and graduated in 2017.

Career
Johnson made his television debut in an episode of the Fox sitcom The Mick in 2017 and also appeared in the television film The Wrong Crush. In 2018, he appeared in an episode of the Fox drama 9-1-1. In 2019, Johnson appeared in two episodes of the Hulu original series, Light as a Feather. In May 2020, Johnson starred opposite Scout Taylor-Compton in the independent horror film Star Light. On October 23, 2020, it was announced that Johnson had been cast in the role of Theo Carver on NBC's Days of Our Lives. Johnson made his debut on November 6, and departed on November 12. While he was only slated to appear in a handful of episodes, Johnson told Soap Opera Digest that he was definitely open to a return. In 2021, it was announced that Johnson was set to reprise the role in March 2021.

Filmography

Awards and nominations

References

External links
 

Living people
American male television actors
21st-century American male actors
Male actors from Louisiana
1999 births